Political warfare in British colonial India aided a British minority in maintaining control over large parts of present-day India, Bangladesh, Pakistan and Burma.

The East India Company obtained a foothold in India in 1757 and from that start expanded the territory it controlled until it was the primary power in the subcontinent. After the Indian Rebellion of 1857 the British Government nationalised the Company creating the British Raj. The Company lost all its administrative powers; its Indian possessions, including its armed forces, were taken over by the Crown pursuant to the provisions of the Government of India Act 1858. A new British government department, the India Council, was created to handle the governance of India, and its head, the Secretary of State for India, was entrusted with formulating Indian policy. The Governor-General of India gained a new title (Viceroy of India), and implemented the policies devised by the India council. As a result of their relatively small presence in the country the British resorted to many methods to retain control of India.

Economic manipulation
Once it had established its factories (trading bases) in India the East India Company started to highlight the benefits of trade with them to the local merchant classes in Surat and Bengal. This helped lure the merchant class away from local rulers to the East India Company as when it persuaded local financiers to abandon the Bengali nawab in 1756.

The East India Company recruited James Steuart in 1772 to help advise on the political aspects of the Indian and Bengali economy. Steuart recommended creating a central bank and making local bankers and moneylenders directors to soak their pooled wealth back into the economy, as well as a more efficient system of taxation to keep that wealth from falling back into their hands. While this policy was not adopted, the Company did establish a more universal currency based on the sicca rupee to restrain the power of the shroff moneylenders.

Later when the Company had increased its power and influence in the subcontinent it started acting as a government. In 1793, Lord Cornwallis abolished the right of local landholders to collect dues on trade which cut back on the feudal powers of the princes, limiting their military strength and turning them into landlords.

Indian Civil Service
After the Indian Rebellion in 1857, the new British administration created a close partnership with certain land-holders and princes to strengthen their grip on power. This was either to create a colonial hierarchy of the various ethnic groups in India, "each arranged into appropriate social classes, whose spiritual and material improvement were entrusted to the paternal direction of gentlemanly rulers" or 'a single hierarchy all its subjects, Indian and British'.

The Army and the Civil Service were the main instruments of British power, staffed by only a small number of European officials. This imperial service became, "a large vested interest of the educated upper middle class. By 1913–14, for example, the Government of India devoted no less than 53 million pounds (65 percent of the total budget of 82 million pounds) to the army and civil administration. Imperial service enabled the mainly southern, professional and public-school culture to reproduce itself abroad and also... create facsimiles among elites in the new colonies established. The Indians in the Civil Service were to be brought up as gentlemen and an "Eton in India" was established, thereby perpetuating a political ruling class of Indians owing their position to England. The native Indians in the Civil Service became the bridge by which the British governed their territories in India or as the official Zachary Macaulay said in 1834, we "must do our best to form a class who may be interpreters between us and the millions whom we govern; a class of persons, Indian in blood and colour, but English in taste, opinions, in morals, and in intellect." The Indian civil service (ICS) held nearly every senior, non-military, position in the government and through the creation of a new ruling caste, and propaganda, "invented an ideology of imperial service and amassed a scholarly literature in which India’s history, society, economy and culture were interpreted as a story of chaos from which only the "steel frame" of Civilian [Indian Civil Service] rule had been able to save them."

In 1885 after the founding of the Indian National Congress, native Indians began campaigning against the power of the Indian Civil Service by attacking it with a slogan that stressed the "unBritishness of British rule". In response, the Service rejected the idea of more Indians in its ranks, but instead offered concessions to allow more Indians in local legislative councils; however as the ICS integrated the councils, they carefully included members of different religions and castes to inhibit effectiveness and largely neutralise any check on their power. In addition, membership to the legislative councils was by appointment, rather than election, and the councils were restricted to a consultative role.

Political Manipulation
The East India Company increased its power in India by playing local rulers off against each other and the declining Mughal Empire.

Lord Dalhousie, the Company Governor General between 1848 and 1856 established a principle, the Doctrine of Lapse, that if any princely state or territory under the direct influence (paramountcy) of the British East India Company would automatically be annexed if the ruler was either "manifestly incompetent or died without a direct heir". This allowed the Company to remove rulers it viewed as troublesome.

After the Indian Rebellion and the transition of rule from the East India Company to the Crown, the British attempted to prevent future disturbances by strengthening indigenous elites in some regions of the colony and allowing them to rule local lands along supposedly traditional lines.

Parallel developments affected the Indian Civil Service after the Company’s system of patronage came to an end with Company rule; there was renewed effort to tie the Indian landholders to the princes and the Raj, endorsing their power and privilege, revitalising the nobility, and then tying it to the Queen by proclaiming her Empress of India. In this way, Britain increased the power of local nobility and made it known to them that their power came from the Queen.  "Many of them [princes] owe their very existence to British justice and arms...The situation of these feudatory States, checker boarding all India as they do, is a safeguard. It is like establishing a vast network of friendly fortresses in debatable territory." Also, to appease some of the nobles' concerns in the aftermath of the Indian Rebellion, princes were allowed to adopt heirs rather than have their estates automatically ceded to British control at their death.

Direct and Indirect Rule
Direct rule required replacing of pre-existing political institutions and replacing them with centralised, territory-wide, and bureaucratic legal-administrative institutions that were controlled by colonial officials. Indirect rule was a form of colonial control via collaboration with indigenous intermediaries who controlled regional political institutions.

Colonial India was a mix of the two types of rule. While the Civil Service ran a large portion of the country, "in peripheral regions, chiefs, princes, sultans, and other indigenous leaders controlled "customary" legal-administrative institutions that were organised along patrimonial lines." Leading colonial officials believed indirect rule was more adaptive and culturally sensitive, far superior to direct rule, in that indirect rule allowed for social development through gradual change from within rather than shattering the social fabric, producing opposition from the local populace. Indirect rule was less confrontational and more collaborative, and therefore viewed as a better means for control.

The colonial administration recognised around 600 semi-autonomous princely states, nominally advised by a British resident; the states possessed one quarter of the country’s population. British administrators also employed tax collectors and landlords even in the more "directly" ruled regions of the country and paid for the landlord’s loyalty with large tracts of land and some power to collect taxes for personal use.

When they didn’t need to resort to martial strength, the East India Company, and later the British Foreign Office, Indian Civil Service or military resorted to bribery and tributes to woo local rulers. In the early 1800s they presented the ruler of the Punjab, Ranjit Singh, with five English dray horses, which would have been larger than any horse he had seen before, horses being one of his many loves. When the state of Punjab eventually became aggressive in 1843, the British annexed it, taking Kashmir and putting it under a ruler more amenable to the British. The Punjab was official annexed in 1849.

Proxies
In the areas north of India, it was dangerous for a European to travel. The British military often used Indian trained cartographers and intelligence officers called pundits to scout for them. These pundits often posed as Muslim or Buddhist holy men, with their map making tools disguised as prayer beads and a prayer wheel. Political intelligence was passed to the Foreign Office through these pundits gathering topographical intelligence, and by British officers on the North-West Frontier.

Religion as a tool of power
The Company banned some Hindu practices like sati and thuggee, which they found particularly abhorrent, and began to allow Hindu widows to remarry in 1856. Governor-General Dalhousie had begun to allow Christian converts to inherit ancestral property starting in 1850. Though overall, the East India Company men were not "eager to anglicise India, fearing to offend the educated class on whose support they depended, and arouse religious antagonism." In 1813, though they had been forced to admit Christian missionaries, the Company tried to avoid being seen as a proponent of the missions. A publication during the Indian Mutiny of 1857 states that the East India Company even manifested disfavour towards Christianity to obtain the confidence of Hindus.

Examining religion from a more political aspect, the Company codified Muslim and Hindu law to take the flexibility out of the law’s traditional practice, to strengthen the Company’s indirect rule and support the local pro-British elites. Initially, the East India Company administration favoured the Hindus over the Muslims as government agents because the Hindus were generally less hostile to their presence; the Company removed Muslims from positions of power over its tenure in India. However, by 1893 Hindu power in the Indian National Congress (INC) was growing at rate disquieting to the British, so they reversed their traditional policies and began encouraging Muslims to enter the political apparatus to make the organization less effective.

Subversion
For much of the 18th and 19th centuries, political warfare and subversion were used by the Russians to destabilise British rule in India, as well as by the British to retain a hold on their Indian territories. This political contest, largely using proxies, is called The Great Game. The term was coined by British officer Captain Arthur Conolly in the early 19th century and made famous by Rudyard Kipling’s book Kim. The Game took place from the Caucuses to Tibet and south to India, with the control over the Indian subcontinent and Afghanistan as the ultimate goal.

In the 1857–58 Indian Mutiny of native soldiers serving in the armed forces of the East India Company, many British suspected Russian or Persian agents of having a hand in spreading rumours that sparked the conflict; the core of the rumours were that the British had smeared pig and cow fat on the ammo cartridges used by the sepoys. The fat on the cartridges, which would have to be opened by mouth prior to being loaded into a rifle, would have spiritually desecrated the Muslim or Hindu soldiers.

References

Political repression in British India
Military history of India
Military history of British India
Indian independence movement